Free bleeding is the practice of menstruating without blocking or collecting the period flow. In recent years it has become a subject of public debate.

History
The movement started in the 1970s as a reaction to toxic shock syndrome, a rare and sometimes fatal condition that can be caused when bacteria grow in tampons worn to absorb menstrual bleeding.  It regained popularity in 2014 as a result of a prank originating in the internet site 4chan. Kiran Gandhi ran in the London Marathon, while free bleeding as a symbolic act to combat menstrual stigma around the world. The movement focuses on a woman's and gender minorities own comfort.  The movement has also led to free products for women and gender minorities in school bathrooms. More recently, efforts have been made to extend this movement to trans men who also menstruate as part of "menstrual equality". Some campuses are adding free menstrual products to men's bathrooms as well.

Menstrual practices in India 

Many cultures have different approaches to this monthly experience for women and gender minorities. These may differ from rituals to isolation. For example, menstruation huts, used by the Balinese and the Hindus in South India and Rastafarian societies, serve as a "protection system" for women who are menstruating to keep them separated from their families. They believe these huts protect one, especially during their first period, from bad dreams as long as they stay awake all through the night.

In India, these practices for menstruation come from the same social agents as they do in many other countries and areas in the world, including media, parental sensitivity, and peers/people within the community. "In India [menstruation] is considered unclean, and young girls are restricted from participating in household and religious activities during menstruation." This sense of uncleanliness is partially due to only 12% of women can afford the necessary sanitation needed for periods.

Practices in Taiwan, Japan, and South Korea 
Japan was the first country to permit period leave in 1947. Subsequently following, South Korea now offers women 1 day off per month. Taiwanese have 3 days off per year, and Indonesians are allowed to take 2 days off per month. Japan first originally started period leave for more simplistic reasons of sanitation since women used to have to use rags and cotton cloth for period products. With today's developed period products, women and gender minorities can take leave for cramps and discomfort that usually accompanies periods for most women.

Products

Free bleeding underwear are a result of the free bleeding movement that have received media attention. These products are in response to the use of tampons.

References

Further reading 
  [20:40]

Feminist theory
Feminist movement
Menstrual cycle